Gerald Henry Nash (born 7 December 1975) is an Irish Labour Party politician who has been a Teachta Dála (TD) for the Louth constituency since 2020, and previously from 2011 to 2016. He previously served as Minister of State for Business and Employment from 2014 to 2016. He was a Senator for the Labour Panel from 2016 to 2020.

Early life
Nash was born on 7 December 1975. His father was a union representative in a factory and active in the Labour Party. He attended St. Joseph's CBS, Drogheda and graduated with an Hons. BA in Politics & History from University College Dublin. He was a former PR consultant to the trade unions and the not-for-profit sector. He was a former manager of the Upstate Theatre Project company in Drogheda and was a former teacher in St. Oliver's Community College in Drogheda.

Political career

Councillor and mayor of Drogheda (1999–2011)
Nash was a member of Louth County Council for the Drogheda local electoral area from 2000 to 2011, and a member of Drogheda Town Council from 1999 to 2011. He served as mayor of Drogheda from 2004 to 2005.

Dáil Éireann (2011–2016)
He was elected as a Labour Party TD for the Louth constituency at the 2011 general election. He lost his seat at the 2016 general election.

Minister of State
In July 2014, he was appointed as Minister of State for Business and Employment, with responsibility for small and medium business, collective bargaining and low pay commission at the Department of Business, Enterprise and Innovation. He was also made a Super Junior Minister, which meant he attended cabinet meetings but did not have a vote.

While a Minister of State, Nash commissioned the first major independent study of zero and low hour contracts in the Irish labour market. The research was carried out by the University of Limerick and published in November 2015. At the time Nash, himself a former National Secretary of Labour Youth, praised the "vocal campaign" run by his party's youth wing on the issue of zero hour contracts.

Seanad Éireann (2016–2020)
In April 2016, Nash was elected to Seanad Éireann as a Senator for the Labour Panel. Party leader Brendan Howlin subsequently appointed him as Labour Party Spokesperson on Equality, and Labour Affairs and Workers Rights. Nash is currently party Spokesperson on Employment and Social Protection.

In 2018, Nash put forward a bill to issue an apology to men convicted of homosexual activity, prior to its legalisation. The motion received all-party support, and Taoiseach Leo Varadkar delivered an apology to the Dáil later that year. Nash put forward a bill in 2019 which aimed to provide greater protection for low paid workers, reform Joint Labour Committees and give the Labour Court the ability to set rates of pay above the minimum wage in low paid sectors of the economy.

Return to Dáil (2020–)
Nash was re-elected to the Dáil following the 2020 general election. 

After Brendan Howlin announced his intention to step down as leader of the Labour Party, Nash was considered a potential candidate for the party leadership race. However, he ruled himself out shortly afterwards, saying "There is a responsibility on my local Dáil colleagues and I to work night and day both locally and nationally to fix them. This is where my immediate focus must lie". Nash nominated Aodhán Ó Ríordáin for the position of leader.

Personal life
Nash is a director of Drogheda Youth Development, the Calipo Theatre and Picture Company, a Member of Board of the Droichead Arts Centre, a member of Drogheda Rotary Club and a former member of Louth VEC.

Nash suffers from Crohn's disease, and has spoken about being bullied as a teenager for it.

References

External links
Gerald Nash's page on the Labour Party website

1975 births
Living people
Alumni of University College Dublin
Labour Party (Ireland) TDs
Local councillors in County Louth
Mayors of places in the Republic of Ireland
Members of the 25th Seanad
Members of the 31st Dáil
Members of the 33rd Dáil
Ministers of State of the 31st Dáil
Politicians from County Louth
Labour Party (Ireland) senators
People with Crohn's disease